Tekeshykhy (also, Teke-Shikhi) is a village in the Quba Rayon of Azerbaijan.

References 

Populated places in Quba District (Azerbaijan)